The Guildhall Lectures were an annual series of talks on the theme of communication, organised by the British Association.

The lectures, held in the London Guildhall, were sponsored and broadcast by Granada Television.  The first set of three lectures were held in 1959, and they continued until at least 1984.  Broadly on the theme of "Communication in the Modern World", they concerned the arts, sciences, politics and mass media.

List of lectures

References

British lecture series
Recurring events established in 1959
Science education in the United Kingdom
Science lecture series
Technology history of the United Kingdom
Television shows produced by Granada Television
1959 establishments in the United Kingdom